A bollard is a short vertical post used in maritime contexts for mooring or towing craft, or on land for traffic control.

Bollard may also refer to:

People
 Alan Bollard (born 1951), governor of the Reserve Bank of New Zealand
 Bob Bollard, producer of almost all Harry Belafonte albums from 1959 to 1965
 John Bollard (judge) (1940–2009), New Zealand judge
 John Bollard (politician) (1839–1915), New Zealand politician
 John Bollard (Catholic priest) (born 1965), former Jesuit who sued the Society of Jesus over claims of sexual harassment
 Richard Bollard (1863–1927), New Zealand politician

Miscellaneous
 The Bollard, a former alternative news publication in Portland, Maine now known as Mainer
 USCGC Bollard (WYTL-65614), a cutter ship operating in Long Island Sound and north to Narragansett Bay
 Bollard, snow or ice shaped to form an anchor point, in mountaineering